Leiodidae is a family of beetles with around 3800 described species found worldwide. Members of this family are commonly called round fungus beetles due to the globular shape of many species, although some are more elongated in shape. They are generally small or very small beetles (less than 10 mm in length) and many (but not all) species have clubbed antennae.

Members of the family are generally saprophagous or scavengers feeding on carrion or decaying organic matter like dung, or are specialised on feeding on specific types of fungus. Many species have reduced wings, with about half of all described species being flightless.

The oldest fossil of the family is Mesagyrtoides from Shar-Teg, Mongolia, dating the Late Jurassic (Tithonian). Members of modern subfamilies appear during the Cretaceous, with Cretaceous members of the family being primarily known from Burmese amber.

See also 
 List of Leiodidae genera

References 

 Family description
 Web-based taxonomy pages ("scratchpad") for the Cholevinae of the world (here treated as a separate family)

External links 

 
Staphylinoidea
Beetle families
Articles containing video clips